Yasir Nawaz Baloch is a Pakistani director, producer, screenwriter, actor and former model. He has directed Wrong No. (2015), Mehrunisa V Lub U (2017) and Wrong No. 2 (2019).

Personal life
Baloch was born to Fareed Nawaz Baloch (d. 2001), an actor who "had more than 100 TV plays to his credit" and "also performed in two films", in a family of four children. He is the elder brother of a comedian and television director Danish Nawaz Baloch. He married Nida Yasir, a television producer, actress and host.

Career
Baloch started his career as an actor and model. Later he started direction and production of television dramas.

Filmography

Television

Telefilms

Films

Accolades

References

External links

Male actors from Karachi
Pakistani male television actors
Pakistani television directors
Pakistani television producers
Pakistani film directors
Pakistani film producers
Pakistani screenwriters
Baloch people
Living people
1970 births